Callywith College is a further education college in Bodmin, Cornwall. The first all-new college in the UK for 20 years, it was created with the assistance of Truro and Penwith College to serve students aged 16–19 from mid, north and east Cornwall, and opened in September 2017. In 2020 it was rated 'outstanding' by Ofsted and the top sixth form college in England by the Department for Education’s Education and Skills Funding Agency.

Proposal, consultation, funding, and opening
League tables of educational results for 16- to 19-year-olds in Cornwall indicated that where students did not have easy access to either of Truro and Penwith College’s major campuses then outcomes for those students suffered. As 1500 students from mid and north Cornwall already spent between an hour and two hours each-way on a bus to reach the Truro College campus every day, the building of a new campus or college further north in Cornwall would reduce the time these students needed to spend travelling. This led to a consultation period, where Truro and Penwith College sought the views of the local community and received feedback and input from parents and students who might be hoping to attend the proposed college. It was announced in February 2016 that Callywith College would be a free school under the EFA national funding formula, and supported by Truro and Penwith College. The college opened in September 2017.

Courses and admissions
The college offers 30 A Levels, 13 vocational Level 3 Extended Diplomas, five Level 2 Progression courses and a Level 1 Progression course. Applications can be made either directly to the college or through local schools. Priority will be given to students whose applications are received by 31 January.

Results
In 2020 A Level students at the college achieved a 99.3% overall pass rate overall, with 83% of entries being awarded A*-C grades. Extended Diploma students achieved a 100% pass rate with 44% achieving distinction grades or higher. In 2019 there was a 100% pass rates across all A Levels and Extended Diplomas. On 27 A Level courses, 83% scored grade A*-C. Subjects including A Level biology, chemistry, maths, Spanish, photography, fine art, geography and psychology saw over 50% of students achieving A*-B.

Ofsted inspection
Ofsted rated Callywith College as "Grade 1 Outstanding" across every category in 2020.

Snow
Callywith College came to national attention in February 2019 when staff and 400 students had to spend a night in the college due to snow.

Relationship to Truro and Penwith College
Truro and Penwith College own the Callywith College site and senior staff from Truro and Penwith College lead Callywith College, implementing common systems and processes, ensuring the same levels of quality. A new Cornwall STEM Skills Centre is being built by Truro and Penwith College on land adjacent to the College.

References

External links
Callywith College website
Callywith College consultation booklet
Ofsted Inspection Report, 2020

2017 establishments in the United Kingdom
Further education colleges in Cornwall
Bodmin
Free schools in England
Educational institutions established in 2017